Roseray is a hamlet in the Canadian province of Saskatchewan.

See also 
List of hamlets in Saskatchewan
List of communities in Saskatchewan

References 

Unincorporated communities in Saskatchewan
Pittville No. 169, Saskatchewan